Kathanayakudu is a 2008 Indian Telugu-language drama film produced by Aswani Dutt and G. P. Vijayakumar. It is directed by P. Vasu. The film is a remake of the Malayalam film Kadha Parayumbol (2007) and stars Rajinikanth in an extended guest appearance along with Jagapati Babu and Meena.. Sunil and Dharmavarapu play pivotal roles. The film was a commercial success and received positive reviews. It was simultaneously made in Tamil as Kuselan, which released to mixed reviews and was a below average grosser.

The film explores the pressures of friendship, and revolves around a villager who had shared a strong friendship with a popular cinema actor while they were in their youth. However, due to their different career routes, they are eventually forced to part ways; one becoming a national figure, the other becoming a village barber. Decades later, the actor returns to the village to participate in his film's shooting. Whilst the entire village becomes excited about the prospect of seeing the actor, the barber fears that his old friend would have forgotten him and eventually neglected him.

Plot
The plot tells the story of two childhood friends: Balakrishna (Jagapathi Babu) and Ashok Kumar (Rajinikanth). Balu stops at nothing to make his friend happy. As time passes by, they take different paths, and Balu becomes a barber in a small village called Siricilla. He marries Devi (Meena) and has three children and leads a happy life. However, his finances are poor and he is often led to the door of Dharmaraju (Dharmavarapu), the financier. He has tough competition from the smarter and more clever Shanmugam (Sunil), who has a salon opposite his shop. Balu is a man with self-respect and honesty. His life continues the same until one day there is news that a film shooting is going to happen in a place near their village and the hero of the film is superstar Ashok Kumar. The news spreads rapidly, but Balu hesitates to reveal himself to be a friend of Ashok Kumar. However, people around Balu learn about their friendship, and suddenly those who have been ridiculing him start doing favors for him—only to meet Ashok Kumar, or at least watch him from outside. Balu is hesitant to do what they want, and soon people start shunning him. Balu faces poor treatment even from his children. At last, Ashok Kumar publicly acknowledges Balu as his childhood friend who made him a superstar, and he meets Balu.

Cast
Main cast
 Rajinikanth as Ashok Kumar. Ashok Kumar is dubbed as the "superstar" in South Indian cinema, who comes to the village to participate in his film's shooting. The arrival of him prompts the villagers' excitement, with all of them wanting to see the superstar. (extended guest appearance; voice dubbed by S. P. Balasubrahmanyam)
 Jagapathi Babu as Balakrishna. Balakrishna, more commonly referred to as Balu, is a village barber. He lives care-free with his wife and three children, despite his financial struggles. His salon fails to earn profits due to his reluctance to accept assistance from others. Balu has a dilemma when his old friend Ashok Kumar returns to the village.
 Meena as Sreedevi. Sreedevi is the wife of Balu, who is commonly known for being rather boisterous and open-hearted despite her poor state of living. She shares great affection for her husband despite the villagers' hate towards him.
 Sunil as Shanmugam. Shanmugam is a rival barber in the village, whose business is more profitable than Balu's.
 Dharmavarapu as Dharmaraju. Dharmaraju is the financier who helps Balu manage the latter's money.

Supporting cast

 Shafna as Balakrishna's elder daughter
 Revathy Sivakumar as Balakrishna's younger daughter 
 Ali
 M. S. Narayana as Dharmaraju's assistant
 Duvvasi Mohan as Dharmaraju's assistant
 Narsing Yadav as Dharmaraju's assistant
 Venu Madhav
 Tanikella Bharani as School teacher
 R. Sundarrajan
 Manobala as Constable
 Chinni Jayanth 
 Kondavalasa
 Rallapalli
 Vijayaranga Raju
Nalla Venu
 Rajababu
 Chitti Babu
 Gundu Hanumantha Rao 
 Gautam Raju
 Ananth
 Mohan Raman as Ashok Kumar's PA
 Thalapathi Dinesh
 Aajam
 Potti Rambabu
 Garimalla Visweswara Rao
 Geetha as Headmistress
 Rajitha 
 Fathima Babu as Sister Maria
 Sona as Sona
 Saira Banu
 Bhavana
 Shilpa
 Master Amal
 Baby Revathi

Guest appearances

 Nayanthara as herself
 Brahmanandam as Koya Dora 
 Prabhu as Sub-Inspector Satya
 Nizhalgal Ravi as himself
 Vijayakumar as himself
 Madhan Bob as himself
 Mamta Mohandas as Assistant director
Special appearances in the song "Cinema Cinema"
(in order of appearance; reused footage from Kuselan)
 Suriya
 Khushbu
 Sneha
 G. V. Prakash Kumar
 Soundarya Rajinikanth
 P. Vasu

Soundtrack

The soundtrack of Kathanayakudu was released on 30 June 2008. The soundtrack consists of five songs. The song Cinema Cinema commemorates the 75th anniversary of Telugu cinema. Footage of Suriya, Khushbu, and Sneha and archival footage of famous superstar actors N. T. Rama Rao (popularly "NTR"), Akkineni Nageswara Rao ("ANR"), M. G. Ramachandran ("MGR"), and Rajkumar are shown with each chorus of this song. The verse alternates between clips shot of an actual movie crew filming on location, intercut with real-life superstar actor Rajinikanth — who plays a fictional superstar actor in this film — spoofing blockbuster movies such as Zorro, Lawrence of Arabia, House of Flying Daggers, and the James Bond series.

Production

Development
Following P. Vasu and Rajinikanth's film Chandramukhi in 2005, Vasu had been keen to cast Rajinikanth in another role. Before signing Kathanayakudu, he had narrated a story titled Vettaiyan, which would have been a sequel of a character featured in Chandramukhi. Early in 2008, Rajinikanth signed up for S. Shankar's Robo, while Kathanayakudu was launched at the Taj Coromandel in Chennai on 14 January 2008, coinciding with Pongal. P. Vasu signed up Rajinikanth and Jagapathi Babu to portray the lead roles, while Aswani Dutt agreed to produce the film in Telugu. The film is a remake of the Malayalam film Kadha Parayumbol, which was written by Sreenivasan, who also played the lead role in the film.

Casting and crew
Vasu made it clear that Rajinikanth would not perform an honorary role in the film, which Mammooty had portrayed in the original, but would play a full role, stating that, "the whole story revolves around him [Rajnikanth]". In the Telugu version, comedy actors Sunil, Brahmanandam, Tanikella Bharani and Venu Madhav all signed up to play the roles of Jagapati Babu's fellow villagers. Ileana D'Cruz turned down an offer to act in the film, citing scheduling conflicts. Like the Tamil version, it was said that several prominent Telugu actors had been approached to be a part of a song in the project, but none were selected. Technicians were common in both versions in the two films. with G. V. Prakash Kumar operating as the music composer and Arvind Krishna as the cinematographer.

Filming 
The film's launch was on 7 March 2008 at the AVM Studios in Chennai with the leading artists present. P. Vasu said that the shooting lasted 82 days, with the versions being shot simultaneously and that most of the movie was shot inside the Ramoji Rao film city, with other destinations including Kerala and Pollachi.

Release and marketing 
Rediff gave the film two and a half stars (2.5 Star) and wrote: "P Vasu conceives everything in a larger than life canvas keeping in sync with the image of the superstar he is directing. And while he seems to have gone overboard by moving away from the original, Kathanayakudu is worth a watch for the touching last moments." The promotional event took place on 19 July 2008 at the Jawaharlal Nehru Stadium.

References

External links

2008 films
2000s Telugu-language films
Indian multilingual films
Films directed by P. Vasu
Films scored by G. V. Prakash Kumar
Telugu remakes of Malayalam films
Films shot in Alappuzha
Films shot in Hyderabad, India
Films shot at Ramoji Film City
2008 multilingual films

ar:كوسلين
te:కథానాయకుడు